This article contains a list of the facilities of the Joint Air Training Scheme which was a major programme for training South African Air Force, Royal Air Force and Allied air crews during World War II.

An Elementary Flying Training School (EFTS) gave a recruit 50 hours of basic aviation instruction on a simple trainer like the Tiger Moth. Pilots who showed promise went on to training at a Service Flying Training School (STFS). The Service Flying Training School provided advanced training for pilots, including fighter and multi-engined aircraft. Other trainees went on to different specialties, such as wireless, navigation or bombing and gunnery. In South Africa, the Elementary Flying Training School and Service Flying Training School were renamed Air Schools.

Training schools

Training aircraft
The JATS used the following types of aircraft for training:

 Airspeed AS.10 Oxford I & II
 Avro 621 Tutor
 Avro 652a Anson
 Curtiss P.40E/N Kittyhawk I, III & IV
 DH 82a Tiger Moth
 DH.89a Dominie
 Fairey Battle
 Hawker Hart (variants)
 Hawker Hurricane IIb & IIc
 Lockheed L.37 Ventura I and II
 Miles M.19 Master II
 North American Harvard I, IIa and III
 Northrop 8-A5 Nomad I

Minor aircraft types used in any significant numbers included the Curtiss H-75A-4 Mohawk IV, Hawker Hartbees, Hawker Fury, Martin167F Maryland and 
Westland Wapiti.

Glossary

 AFB — Air Force Base
 CFS — Central Flying School
 EFTS – Elementary Flying Training School
 SAAF — South African Air Force
 SFTS – Service Flying Training School
 WAAF —Women's Auxiliary Air Force

See also
 List of British Commonwealth Air Training Plan facilities in Australia
 List of British Commonwealth Air Training Plan facilities in Canada
 List of British Commonwealth Air Training Plan facilities in Southern Rhodesia
 Aircrew brevet

References

South African Air Force bases
Airports in South Africa
BCATP
 
British
British Commonwealth Air Training Plan facilities
South Africa–United Kingdom relations

af:Suid-Afrikaanse Lugmag
cs:South African Air Force
es:Fuerza Aérea Sudafricana
fr:South African Air Force
it:Suid-Afrikaanse Lugmag